List of rectors of the University of Tartu.

Academia Gustaviana (1632–1665)
 Jakob Skytte (illustris, 1632–1633)
 Andreas Virginius (1633)
 Heinrich Hein (1633–1634)
 Johann Below (1634)
 Michael Savonius (prorector, 1634–1635)
 Georg Manzel (prorector, 1635–1636)
 Georg Manzel (1636)
 Lorenz Luden (1636–1637)
 Peter Schomer (1637–1638)
 Salomon Matthiae (1638)
 Andreas Virginius (1638–1639)
 Heinrich Hein (1639–1640)
 Johann Below (1641–1641)
 Andreas Virginius (1641–1642)
 Lorenz Luden (1642–1643)
 Johannes Ericsson (1643–1644)
 Salomon Matthiae (1644–1645)
 Andreas Virginius (1645–1646)
 Heinrich Hein (1648–1649)
 Salomon Matthiae (1649–1650)
 Sebastian Wirdig (1650–1651)
 Johannes Stiernstråle (1651–1652)
 Lorenz Luden (1652–1653)
 Joachim Schelen (1653–1654)
 Johannes Stiernstråle (1654–1655)
 Heinrich Hein (1655–1656)
 Andreas Virginius (prorector, in Tallinn, 1657)
 Georg Preuss (prorector, Tallinn, 1658)
 Gabriel Elffring (prorector, Tallinn, 1659–1660)
 Georg Preuss (prorector, Tallinn, 1661–1662)
 Gabriel Elffring (prorector, Tallinn, 1663–1665)

Academia Gustavo-Carolina (1690–1710)
 Olaus Moberg (1690)
 Carl Lund (1690–1691)
 Lars Micrander (1691)
 Gustav Carlholm (1691–1692)
 Crispin Jernfeld (1692)
 Olaus Skragge (1692–1693)
 Gabriel Skragge (1693)
 Gabriel Sjöberg (1693–1694)
 Sven Cameenhjelm (1694)
 Sven Dimberg (1694–1695)
 Michael Dau (1695)
 Olaus Moberg (1695–1696)
 Olaus Skragge (1696)
 Jakob Friedrich Below (1696–1697)
 Gabriel Skragge (1697)
 Lars Molin (1697–1698)
 Gabriel Sjöberg (1698)
 Sven Cameenhjelm (1698–1699)
 Michael Dau (in Pärnu, 1699–1700)
 Daniel Sarcovius (Pärnu, 1700)
 Daniel Eberhard (Pärnu, 1700)
 Olaus Moberg (Pärnu, 1700–1701)
 Sven Cameenhjelm (Pärnu, 1701)
 Lars Molin (Pärnu, 1701–1702)
 Michael Dau (Pärnu, 1702)
 Johan Folcher (Pärnu, 1702–1703)
 Samuel Auseen (Pärnu, 1703)
 Daniel Sarcovius (Pärnu, 1703–1704)
 Anders Palmrooth (Pärnu, 1704)
 Erik Fahlenius (Pärnu, 1704–1705)
 Samuel Auseen (Pärnu, 1705)
 Lars Braun (Pärnu, 1705–1706)
 Johan Folcher (Pärnu, 1706–1707)
 Jakob Wilde (Pärnu, 1707)
 Ingemund Bröms (Pärnu, 1707–1708)
 Conrad Quensel (Pärnu, 1708)
 Nicolaus Wiraeus (Pärnu, 1708–1709)
 Carl Schultén (Pärnu, 1709)
 Elof Holstenius (Pärnu, 1709–1710)

Kaiserliche Universität zu Dorpat (1802–1893)
 Georg Friedrich von Parrot (prorector, 1802–1803)
 Georg Friedrich von Parrot (1803)
 Daniel Georg Balk (1803–1804)
 Adam Christian Gaspari (1804–1805)
 Georg Friedrich von Parrot (1805–1806)
 Carl Friedrich Meyer (1806–1808)
 Christian Friedrich von Deutsch (1809–1810)
 David Hieronymus Grindel (1810–1812)
 Georg Friedrich von Parrot (1812–1813)
 Martin Ernst von Styx (prorector, 1813–1814)
 Martin Ernst von Styx (1814)
 Friedrich Eberhard Rambach (1814–1816)
 Christian Steltzer (1816)
 Ferdinand Giese (prorector, 1816–1817)
 Ferdinand Giese (1817–1818)
 Gustav von Ewers (1818–1830)
 Friedrich Wilhelm von Parrot (prorector, 1830–1831)
 Friedrich Wilhelm von Parrot (1831–1834)
 Johann Christian Moier (1834–1836)
 Christian Friedrich Neue (1836–1839)
 Karl Christian Ulmann (1839–1841)
 Alfred Wilhelm Volkmann (prorector, 1841–1842)
 Alfred Wilhelm Volkmann (1842)
 Christian Friedrich Neue (1843–1851)
 Eduard Haffner (1851–1858)
 Friedrich von Bidder (1858–1865)
 Guido Samson von Himmelstiern (1865–1868)
 Georg Philipp von Oettingen (1868–1876)
 Ottomar Meykov (1876–1881)
 Eduard von Wahl (1881–1885)
 Alexander Schmidt (1885–1890)
 Ottomar Meykov (1890–1892)
 Anton Budilovitš (1892–1901)

Kaiserliche Universität Jurjew (1893–1918)
 Anton Budilovitš (1892–1901)
 Aleksandr Filippov (1901–1903)
 Grigori Levitski (1903–1905)
 Jevgeni Passek (1905–1908)
 Vissarion Aleksejev (or Alekseyev) (prorector, 1908–1909)
 Vissarion Aleksejev 1909–1914)
 Pjotr Pustoroslev (1915–1917)
 Vissarion Aleksejev (1917–1918)

Landesuniversität Dorpat (1918)
 Karl Dehio (1918)

Eesti Vabariigi Tartu Ülikool (1919–1940)
 Heinrich Koppel (1920–1928)
 Johan Kõpp (1928–1937)
 Richard Hugo Kaho (1938–1940)
 Heinrich Riikoja (1940)

Eesti Omavalitsuse Tartu Ülikool (1941–1944)
 Edgar Kant (temporary, 1941–1944)

Tartu Riiklik Ülikool (1940–1941 and 1944–1989)
 Hans Kruus (1940–1941 ja 1944)
 Alfred Koort (1944–1951)
 Feodor Klement (1951–1970)
 Arnold Koop (1970–1988)

Tartu Ülikool (since 1989)
 Jüri Kärner (1988–1993)
 Peeter Tulviste (1993–1998)
 Jaak Aaviksoo (1998–2006)
 Tõnu Lehtsaar (acting, 2006–2007)
 Alar Karis (2007–2012)
 Volli Kalm (2012–2017, died in office)
 Tõnu Lehtsaar (acting, 2017–2018)
 Toomas Asser (2018–)

References
Album Rectorum Universitatis Tartuensis, 1632–1997. Sirje Tamul. Tartu, 1997.

 
Tartu